.ec is the country code top-level domain (ccTLD) for Ecuador.

Domains and Subdomains
Registrations are made directly at the second level or at the third level beneath these names:
 .EC General use
 .COM.EC Commercial use
 .INFO.EC General information
 .NET.EC Providers of Internet services
 .FIN.EC Financial institutions and services
 .MED.EC Medical and health-related entities
 .PRO.EC Professionals such as lawyers, architects, accountants, etc.
 .ORG.EC Non-profit organizations and entities.
 .EDU.EC Educational entities.
 .GOB.EC Government of Ecuador, since July 2010
 .GOV.EC Formerly used by the Government of Ecuador; replaced by GOB.EC in 2010
 .MIL.EC Ecuadorian military

Notable incidents involving .ec domains
In November 2016, one of the mirror domains of Archive.is, "archive.ec", did not work for a period of 8 consecutive days due to a software bug in the .ec registry.

See also
Internet in Ecuador

References

External links
 .ec Registrar
 NIC.EC - Network Information Center
 IANA .ec whois information

Country code top-level domains
Telecommunications in Ecuador
Internet in Ecuador

sv:Toppdomän#E